Yery with acute (Ы́ ы́) is a letter used in some East Slavic languages. It indicates a stressed yery. For example, in Russian, it can be used to distinguish between тру́сы "cowards" and трусы́ "underpants". However, in Russian, the acute accent is usually only used in dictionaries or children’s books.

Usage
 is used in East Slavic languages, most commonly in Russian as a stressed variant of Ы: трусы́.

Stress plays an important role in Russian. If you want people to understand you correctly it is important to know the place of the stress in the words.

Related letters and other similar characters
Y y : Latin letter Y
Ý ý : Latin letter Ý - a Czech, Faroese, Icelandic, Slovak, and Turkmen letter
Ы ы : Cyrillic letter Yery
Cyrillic characters in Unicode

References

Cyrillic letters with diacritics